Otto Albert Tichý (14 August 1890 – 21 October 1973) was a Czech composer, teacher and organist.

Early life and education
Otto Albert Tichý was born in Martínkov, Moravia, in a Catholic family of a provincial teacher. He studied different instruments and played the organ from an early age. He began composing as a boy. He became a devoted student of Vítězslav Novák at the Prague Conservatory. However, he interrupted his study to work nine years at the most spiritual publisher of this time, Josef Florian, solely for room and board. In 1919 he resumed his study as a pupil of French composer and teacher Vincent d'Indy at the Schola Cantorum. Tichý initially studied organ, Gregorian chant and composition, then contrapuntalism and concord. At Schola Cantorum he got the opportunity to experience music from the 16th to the 18th centuries in vocal polyphony.

Career
After he successfully finished his study, he lived as a private music teacher and organist. He spent six years in France and after his marriage moved to Lausanne with his family, where he worked as organist in cathedral Notre Dame and as professor of music at Dominican gymnasium. In 1936 he returned to Czechoslovakia. After ten years he became choirmaster and organist at St. Vitus Cathedral in Prague and worked as a teacher at Prague Conservatory. He taught choir, Gregorian chant, improvisation, organ accompaniment, conducting, Latin and French. During the Communist period, Tichý remained at Prague Conservatory as a teacher thanks to then Conservatory director Václav Holzknecht and to Tichý's knowledge and skills, especially in languages and music for twenty long years. He left Prague Conservatory at age 75. He also resigned as the organist at St. Vitus. Until the end of his life he wrote music and translated books.

Otto Albert Tichý died at 83, close to his organ-loft.

Few of the composer's works are performed regularly today. His best known pieces are the Missa festival in honorem Sti Alberti Magni, Missa pastoralis in honorem Jesu Infantis in Praga or A Notre-Dame du Chene, and Tantum ergo sacramentum, and Ave Maria, and some other vocal compositions and very nice compositions for small chamber brass or string ensembles.

Tichý's works include orchestral music, chamber music, piano music and songs.

Works
List of compositions by Otto Albert Tichý

External links

References

1890 births
1973 deaths
20th-century classical composers
Czech classical composers
Czech male classical composers
People from Třebíč District
Pupils of Vincent d'Indy
Schola Cantorum de Paris alumni
20th-century Czech male musicians